Mixed team curling at the 2016 Winter Youth Olympics was held from 12 to 17 February at the Kristins Hall in Lillehammer, Norway.

Teams

Group A

Group B

Round-robin standings

Round-robin results
All draw times are listed in Central European Time (UTC+01).

Group A

Friday, February 12
Draw 1
9:00

Saturday, February 13
Draw 2
9:00

Draw 3
16:00

Sunday, February 14
Draw 4
9:00

Draw 5
16:00

Monday, February 15
Draw 6
9:00

Draw 7
16:00

Group B

Friday, February 12
Draw 1
12:30

Saturday, February 13
Draw 2
12:30

Draw 3
19:30

Sunday, February 14
Draw 4
12:30

Draw 5
19:30

Monday, February 15
Draw 6
12:30

Draw 7
19:30

Tiebreaker
Tuesday, February 16, 9:00

Playoffs

Quarterfinals
Tuesday, February 16, 13:30

Semifinals
Tuesday, February 16, 18:00

Bronze medal game
Wednesday, February 17, 9:00

Gold medal game
Wednesday, February 17, 9:00

References

External links

World Curling Federation event page

Mixed team
Olympics